Sir Herbert Nigel Gresley  (19 June 1876 – 5 April 1941) was a British railway engineer. He was one of Britain's most famous steam locomotive engineers, who rose to become Chief Mechanical Engineer (CME) of the London and North Eastern Railway (LNER). He was the designer of some of the most famous steam locomotives in Britain, including the LNER Class A1 and LNER Class A4 4-6-2 Pacific engines. An A1 Pacific, Flying Scotsman, was the first steam locomotive officially recorded over 100 mph in passenger service, and an A4, number 4468 Mallard, still holds the record for being the fastest steam locomotive in the world (126 mph).

Gresley's engines were considered elegant, both aesthetically and mechanically. His invention of a three-cylinder design with only two sets of Walschaerts valve gear, the Gresley conjugated valve gear, produced smooth running and power at lower cost than would have been achieved with a more conventional three sets of Walschaerts gear.

Biography

Gresley was born in Edinburgh, Scotland, during his mother's visit there to see a gynaecologist, but was raised in England at Netherseal, Derbyshire, a member of a cadet branch of a family long seated at Gresley, Derbyshire. After attending school in Sussex and at Marlborough College, Gresley served his apprenticeship at the Crewe works of the London and North Western Railway, afterwards becoming a pupil under John Aspinall at Horwich of the Lancashire and Yorkshire Railway (L&YR). After several minor appointments with the L&YR he was made Outdoor Assistant in the Carriage and Wagon Department in 1901; in 1902 he was appointed Assistant Works Manager at Newton Heath depot, and Works Manager the following year.

He became Assistant Superintendent of the Carriage and Wagon Department of the L&YR in 1904 and a year later moved to the Great Northern Railway (GNR) as Carriage and Wagon Superintendent. He succeeded Henry A. Ivatt as CME of the GNR on 1 October 1911. At the 1923 Grouping, he was appointed CME of the newly formed LNER (the post had originally been offered to the ageing John G. Robinson; Robinson declined and suggested the much younger Gresley). 

During the 1930s, Sir Nigel Gresley lived at Salisbury Hall, near St. Albans in Hertfordshire. Gresley developed an interest in breeding wild birds and ducks in the moat including Mallard ducks. The Hall still exists today as a private residence and is adjacent to the de Havilland Aircraft Heritage Centre, with its links to the design of the famous Mosquito aircraft during World War II.

In 1936, Gresley designed the 1,500 V DC locomotives for the proposed electrification of the Woodhead Line between Manchester and Sheffield. The Second World War forced the postponement of the project, which was completed in the early 1950s. Edgar Claxton was Gresley's assistant throughout this project, working on power supply, equipment and systems, besides carrying out the trials.

Gresley was appointed CBE in 1920 and was knighted in the 1936 Birthday Honours by King Edward VIII. Also in the latter year, Gresley was awarded an honorary DSc by Manchester University and presided over the IMechE.

Gresley died on 5 April 1941, after a short illness, and was buried in the Churchyard Extension of St Peter's Church, Netherseal, Derbyshire. At this time, Gresley was serving as a Lieutenant Colonel in the Royal Engineers Railway Staff Corps.

He was succeeded as the LNER CME by Edward Thompson.

Memorials
A memorial plaque to Gresley's achievements was unveiled at Edinburgh Waverley railway station in 2001. It was created by the Gresley Society and incorporates line drawings of his Flying Scotsman and Mallard locomotives.

Following the redevelopment of the site previously home to Doncaster College, the square outside the new Doncaster Metropolitan Borough Council Offices and Cast Theatre was named Sir Nigel Gresley Square, in honour of the designer of some of the most famous steam locomotives built at Doncaster Plant Works following a public poll of Doncaster residents hosted by the Doncaster Free Press. Sir Nigel Gresley Square was opened to the public as part of the Queen's Diamond Jubilee celebrations, by the Mayor of Doncaster Mr. Peter Davies and two of Nigel Gresley's grandsons, in May 2012.

LNER Class A4 4498 Sir Nigel Gresley is named after its designer.

A statue of Gresley was unveiled at King's Cross station in London on 5 April 2016, the 75th anniversary of his death. Sculptor Hazel Reeves originally included a duck alongside Gresley in reference to his hobby of breeding water fowl and his bird-themed locomotive names such as Mallard, but this was removed from the final design when two of Gresley's grandsons complained it was "demeaning".

The Wetherspoons public house in Swadlincote, Derbyshire, is named The Sir Nigel Gresley in his honour.

Innovations 
 Derived valve motion for 3-cylinder steam locomotives; Gresley Conjugated Valve Gear.
 The largest passenger steam locomotive in the UK, the P2 2-8-2.
 The largest steam locomotive in the UK, the U1 2-8-0+0-8-2 Garratt.
 The 'locomotive that won the war', the V2 2-6-2.
 The first steam locomotive to officially achieve 100 mph, the A3 'Flying Scotsman' 4-6-2.
 The fastest steam locomotive in the world, the A4 'Mallard' 4-6-2 (126.3 mph).
 Another A4, 'Silver Link', previously holding the world speed record for steam locomotives (112 mph)
 The experimental high-pressure LNER Class W1 'hush-hush' 4-6-4 locomotive
 The Silver Jubilee Express
 The articulated railway carriage, first used with some conversions of East Coast Joint Stock (ECJS) carriages in 1907, soon followed by conversions of GNR carriages; new articulated carriages being built for the GNR from 1911.
 The corridor tender to allow longer non-stop running

Locomotives designed by Gresley

GNR
See: Locomotives of the Great Northern Railway
 GNR 536 Class (LNER Class J6) 0-6-0 (1911)
 GNR Class H2 (LNER Class K1) 2-6-0 (1912)
 GNR Class J21 (LNER Class J2) 0-6-0 (1912)
 GNR Class O1 (LNER Class O3) 2-8-0 (1913)
 GNR Class H3 (LNER Class K2) 2-6-0 (1914)
 GNR Class J23 (LNER Class J51) 0-6-0T (1915)
 GNR Class H4 (LNER Class K3) 2-6-0 (1920)
 GNR Class N2 0-6-2T (1920)
 GNR Class O2 2-8-0 (1921)
 GNR Class J23 (LNER Class J50) 0-6-0T (1922)
 GNR Class A1 4-6-2 (1922)

LNER
See: Locomotives of the London and North Eastern Railway
 LNER Class P1 2-8-2 (1925)
 LNER Class U1 Garratt 2-8-0+0-8-2 (1925)
 LNER Class J38 0-6-0 (1926)
 LNER Class J39 0-6-0 (1926)
 LNER Class A3 4-6-2 (1927)
 LNER Class D49 4-4-0 (1927)
 LNER Class B17 4-6-0 (1928)
 LNER Class V1 2-6-2T (1930)
 LNER Class P2 2-8-2 (1934)
 LNER Class A4 4-6-2 (1935)
 LNER Class V2 2-6-2 (1936)
 LNER Class W1 4-6-4 (1937)
 LNER Class K4 2-6-0 (1937)
 LNER Class V3 2-6-2T (1939)
 LNER Class V4 2-6-2 (1941)
 LNER No. 6701 Bo+Bo electric locomotive (1941)

Arms

References

Further reading

External links 

 Comprehensive biography

English mechanical engineers
1876 births
1941 deaths
Knights Bachelor
Commanders of the Order of the British Empire
Locomotive builders and designers
People educated at Marlborough College
People from Leicestershire (before 1897)
Burials in Derbyshire
English railway mechanical engineers
Great Northern Railway (Great Britain) people
London and North Eastern Railway people
Hadley Wood
People from Watton-at-Stone
20th-century British engineers